Erik August Frandsen (born April 20, 1957) is a Danish contemporary artist. In the early 1980s Erik A. Frandsen was part of the artistic movement de unge vilde (the young wild ones red.) and in 1981, he co-founded the artist collective Værkstedet Værst with prominent working with artists such as Lars Nørgård and Christian Lemmerz. He currently works from studios in Copenhagen, Nordfalster and Como, Italy.

Early life
Erik A. Frandsen was born and grew up in a middle-class home in a small village outside of Randers, Denmark with his parents and as the second of four siblings. As a teenager Erik A. Frandsen saw the Danish artist Poul Gernes (1925-1996) wrapping himself head to toe in toilet paper on the evening news. The contrast, discrepancy of this act to his own suburban everyday life appealed to Erik A. Frandsen immensely. He wanted to become an artist himself.  
 
In the years 1976-79, Erik A. Frandsen travelled to hone his craft. He spent time in Greece studying ceramics, in Carrara, Italy working with sculptures and in Paris, France exploring graphics. In 1981 he moved to Copenhagen to pursue a career in arts.

Work / Career
Erik A. Frandsen is an autodidact artist and has no formal academic training. His career took off in the early 1980s and he played a major role in the breakthrough happening on the Danish art scene at the time.  
 
Frandsen finds inspiration for his artworks in the intimate situations in everyday life, in the history of art and from the artists he has encountered and worked alongside through time. His inspiration is diverse, and he gazes towards the art-deco and rococo art as well as pop- and neo-pop artists such as Andy Warhol, Jeff Koons and Gary Hume. To this day Erik A. Frandsen still continues an ongoing exploration of lines and perspectives that is central to his artistic expression.

Style
The mediums and materials explored by Erik A. Frandsen are extensive and varied. From rubber, photographs, boxes and fluorescent tube lights to mere traditional oil on canvas. Later materials and techniques include, but are not limited to, monumental venetian glass-mosaics as well as large reflective stainless-steel surfaces that have been treated with polishing tools to “paint” sensuous flowers. It is a bold choice, creating an obvious and intense clash between material and motive by letting heavy metal and the honing of a drilling machine replace canvas and brush.

Erik A. Frandsen’s oeuvre is characterized by experimentation but also by a recycling of motives and an application of these to various mediums. When applied to the different mediums the same motive resume radically different expressions, allowing for new perspectives and meaning to surface. Among the recurrent motives are the artist's family, classic still lifes and flower compositions.   
 
Though these motives are widely represented and generally easily recognizable in the arts throughout history, Erik A. Frandsen manages to rethink and grant them new life. His flower motives are not flower motives the traditional sense, but weeds such as thistles and dandelions placed in urine bottles and kitsch vases as is seen in his pieces for the decoration of the royal home in Frederik VIIIs Palace in 2010.

Selected public works / commissions
 2020 Til J. H. mosaic staircase at Rigshospitalets Nordfløj, Copenhagen
 2014 Landstingssalen at Christiansborg Palace, Copenhagen
 2010 Frederik VIII’s Palace, Amalienborg, Copenhagen
 2004 The Royal Danish Opera

Selected solo exhibitions
 2019 Erik A. Frandsen I museets samling Horsens Kunstmuseum  
 2017 Flower Angels Hans Alf Gallery  
 2015 Pilgrimage for an Armchair Explorer Horsens Kunstmuseum and Hans Alf Gallery  
 2012 Between Memory and Theft Red Brick Contemporary Art Museum   
 2009 Frozen Moment Desert Faurschou Foundation Beijing   
 2008 The Double Space. Retrospective exhibition of works from 1982-2008 ARoS  
 2007 The Real. Unnaturalism Ny Carlsberg Glyptotek
 2004 Glansbilleder Nationalmuseet and Faurschou Foundation CPH   
 2002 In the Shadow of Light Kunstmuseet Brandts   
 2002 Gidsel Galerie Asbæk   
 1993 Frandsen til Kirkeby ARoS

Selected group exhibitions
 2018 34 år 34 værker Horsens Kunstmuseum  
 2017 Kunsten i lyset – lyset i kunsten Sophienholm 
 2015 Fantasi og følelser: ekspressionistisk grafik ARoS
 2014 På kant med Kirkegaard Kunstcentret Silkeborg Bad
 2013 Flora Danica Statens Naturhistoriske Museum
 2012 Underværker – mesterværker fra danske privatsamlinger Kunsten Museum of Modern Art Aalborg
 2012 Dansk og international kunst efter 1900 Nationalmuseet
 2010 De vilde 80ere Arken Museum of Modern Art
 2005 Michael Kvium, Christian Lemmerz, Erik A. Frandsen  Galleri Brandstrup 
 2005 Carnegie Art Award 2005 Henie Onstad Kunstsenter
 2005 Flower Myth. Vincent van Gogh to Jeff Koons Foundation Beyler, Switzerland
 2005 Særudstilling i Cisternerne Cisternerne og Museet for Moderne Glaskunst
 2004 Blomsten som billede Louisiana Museum of Modern Art Humlebæk

Erik A. Frandsen exhibited his work for the first time in 1981.

Selected awards / recognitions
Thorvaldsens medalje (2016)
Ridderkorset af Dannebrogsordenen (2015)
Statens Kunstfonds livsvarige hædersydelse (2014)
Eckersberg medalje (1996)
 Elected for Documenta IX in Kassel (1992) – as the first Danish artist in history

In 2010 Erik A. Frandsen was chosen to decorate the royal Frederik VIII’s Palæ together with acclaimed artists like Tal R, Olafur Eliasson and Jesper Christiansen.

Collections
Arken Museum of Modern Art. ARoS. Esbjerg Kunstmuseum. Fuglbjerg Kunstmuseum. HEART. Horsens Kunstmuseum. Kanstrupgårdsamlingen. Kunsten Museum of Modern Art Aalborg. Kupferstich Kabinett. Louisiana Museum of Modern Art Humlebæk. Museum van Hedendaagse Kunst. Nationalmuseet (DK). Nasjonal Museet for Kunst, Arkitektur och Design (NO). Randers Kunstmuseum. Shenzhen Art Museum. Scherings Museum of Realist Art. Storstrøm Kunstmuseum. Trapholt. Trondheim Kunstmuseum. Trondheims Kunstforenings samling. Vestsjællands Kunstmuseum. Vejle Kunstmuseum.

Art Market
Erik A. Frandsen in represented by  Galleri Brandstrup in Oslo, Copenhagen based Hans Alf Gallery and Galleri Profilen in Aarhus. His work has been exhibited at international art fairs, such as Art Brussels, Market Art Fair in Stockholm, Enter Art Fair in Copenhagen, Art Cologne and Pulse Contemporary.

References

 https://erikafrandsen.dk/biography/ 
 https://kunstonline.dk/profil/erik_frandsen.php  
 http://denstoredanske.dk/Kunst_og_kultur/Billedkunst/Billedkunst%2c_Danmark_generelt/Værkstedet_Værst

1957 births
Living people
Danish contemporary artists
Neo-expressionist artists